The Cave of the Silken Web or Pan Si Dong may refer to the following films:

The Cave of the Silken Web (1927 film)
The Cave of the Silken Web II, 1930 sequel of the first film
The Cave of the Silken Web (1967 film)